The 1975–76 Liga Alef season was the last in which Liga Alef was the second tier of Israeli football, as at the end of the season, Liga Artzit came into existence, and became the new second tier, Liga Alef became the third tier.

Hapoel Acre (champions of the North Division) and Hapoel Yehud (champions of the South Division) promoted to Liga Leumit, both in the first time in their history.

The eight clubs which placed between second to fifth in each of their respective regional divisions, with the addition of four clubs which have been relegated from Liga Leumit, formed the new Liga Artzit in the following season.

All the other clubs which placed sixth to fifteenth, continued to the new Liga Alef as third tier clubs. the bottom two clubs in each regional division demoted to Liga Bet (new fourth tier).

North Division

South Division

References
Liga Alef tables Davar, 13.6.76, Historical Jewish Press 
Previous seasons The Israel Football Association 

Liga Alef seasons
Israel
2